Chad Anderson may refer to:

 Chad Anderson (ice hockey) (born 1982), American ice hockey defenseman
 Chad Anderson (businessman) (born 1980), American entrepreneur
 Chad Anderson (politician) (born 1979), member of the Minnesota House of Representatives